"Oats, Peas, Beans and Barley Grow" (often sung as "Oats and Beans and Barley Grow") is a traditional British and American folk song, 1380 in the Roud Folk Song Index.

The tune normally used goes by the name "Baltimore" and appears in Joshua Cushing's book "The Fifer's Companion" (1790). According to Alice Bertha Gomme's book "The Traditional Games of England, Scotland and Ireland" (1894), this is a "play song", in which children perform actions with the song, standing in a ring. In "Notes and Queries" 7th series, number xii (c 1870) it is discussed, but the Columbia State University website claims that the earliest known version of the words is dated 1898 (Gomme).

Recordings
 Tim Hart and Maddy Prior on "Folk Songs of Olde England" Vol 2 (1968)
 Roberts and Barrand on "Mellow With Ale From the Horn" (1975) as "Oats and Beans and Barley Grows" 
 Raffi on Baby Beluga as "Oats and Beans and Barley" 1980
 Tony Bluto featuring Janet Palmer in the 1995 VHS tape Nursery Rhyme Time, directed, produced and written by Allan Burr
 The Friends of Fiddler's Green This Side of the Ocean as "Oats and Beans" 1981 and 1997. The highest note is D, and the lowest note is G. The dynamic is soft, The part in this song that gets higher is measure 5&6.
 The Kidsongs Kids and the Biggles on Country Sing-Along (1994) as "Watch Our Oats and Barley Grow"
 The Revels on "The Wild Mountain Thyme" (1994)
 Broadside Band on "Old English Nursery Rhymes" (1996)
James Turner in the 1992 Barney & Friends episode "Eat, Drink And Be Healthy" (season 1, episode 5)
 David Holt featuring Sue-Elliott Nicholls, Maria Darling and Jimmy Hibbert in the 2005 Muffin The Mule episode "Muffin's Harvest Home" (series 1, episode 13)

Published Versions
 Lucy Broadwood English County Songs
 In Notes and Queries 7th series, number xii (c 1870)
 In Northall, G. F. English Folk-Rhymes: A collection of traditional verses relating to places and persons, customs, superstitions, etc. (1892) pg. 370
 Hampshire Dance Tunes by Bob Shatwell & Paul Sartin (2007)
 The very first edition of the Journal of the EFDSS had an article on this song.

References

Baltimore
Gomme, Children's Games
Music and lyrics This website (folkinfo.org forum) closed in December 2012
Music and lyrics This website archives a copy of the closed folkinfo.org database
Columbia State University
Lyrics
 The British Library - Singing and dancing Audio recording of a variation of the song, Green Peas and Barley Grow, from 1961

American folk songs
British folk songs
Singing games
Year of song unknown